The Valparaiso Beacons women's basketball team represents Valparaiso University in Valparaiso, Indiana. The basketball team competes in the Missouri Valley Conference. The Beacons play in the Athletics-Recreation Center.

History
The Beacons have an all-time record of 543–668 as of the end of the 2018–19 season. Valparaiso transitioned into the Missouri Valley Conference in 2017, after Wichita State left the Valley for the ACC. Valparaiso was previously associated with the Horizon League in 2007, their third conference since beginning play in 1971. They previously played in the North Star Conference from 1987 to 1992 and the Mid-Continent Conference from 1992 to 2006.

NCAA tournament results

References

External links
 

 
Women's basketball teams in the United States